The Panoramique des Dômes is a 5.2 km long rack railway that allows access to the top of the Puy de Dôme, in France, since mid-2012.

The railway is owned by the Conseil général du Puy-de-Dôme.

The train has a capacity of  persons an hour.

History 

There was a railway with a non-rack central rail on the Puy de Dôme (using the Hanscotte system) from 1907 to 1925. Construction of the railway started in 1906.  It connected Lamartine in Clermont-Ferrand (elevation 390 metres) to an artificial platform near the mountain top at  metres. The railway was  km long and operated between 1907 and 1926 at a loss.

The Conseil général du Puy-de-Dôme voted for construction of the new railway in 2008.  Construction work was started by SNC-Lavalin in March 2010. SNC-Lavalin operated the railway under a 35-year agreement with the public service.

Traffic was stopped in October 2012 after an accident involving an empty railcar.  The operator was replaced by SFTA, a subsidiary of Transdev specialising in mountain railways, and the line was reopened on 2 May 2013.

Rolling Stock 

The Swiss firm Stadler received an order for 4 articulated motor cars in November 2009 of the type GTW 2/6.

Weight  : .
Train length  : 
Capacity: 200 (112 seating and 88 standing)

See also
List of highest railways in Europe

References

External links 
 Conseil Général du Puy de Dôme, Panoramique des Dômes
 
 

Mountain railways
Rack railways in France
Tourist attractions in Puy-de-Dôme
Railway lines opened in 2012
Metre gauge railways in France